The Rajagiri Fort was built in 1200 AD. It is located in Rajagiri, Tamil Nadu, India, meaning Kings Hill. It is 1 km from Gingee Market. It is made up of saffron and black rock. Currently, the fort includes a magazine, gymnasium, palace site, audience hall, stable, clock tower, granary, treasury in Indo-Islamic style, store-house for grains and an elephant tank. In the West Entrance, Venu Gopalaswami Temple, Ranganath Temple of Vijayanagar Kings, Kalyan Mandap, Sadatulla Khan's Masjid (1717–18), Mahabbat Khan's masjid. Bath tubs with continuous supply of water, a huge cannon, belong to the temple on the top of the fort near Chakrakulam-Kunda (reservoir).

References

Forts in Tamil Nadu